Trogloconcha is a genus of sea snails, marine gastropod mollusks in the family Larocheidae.

Species
Species within the genus Trogloconcha include:
 Trogloconcha christinae Geiger, 2003
 Trogloconcha lamellinodosa Geiger, 2012
 Trogloconcha lozoueti Geiger, 2008
 † Trogloconcha marshalli (Lozouet, 1998) 
 Trogloconcha ohashii Kase & Kano, 2002
 Trogloconcha tesselata Kase & Kano, 2002
 Trogloconcha yoidanyi Fr. Giusti, Pagli & Micali, 2018

References

 Geiger D.L. (2003) Phylogenetic assessment of characters proposed for the generic classification of Recent Scissurellidae (Gastropoda: Vetigastropoda) with a description of one new genus and six new species from Easter Island and Australia. Molluscan Research 23: 21-83.
 Geiger D.L. & Jansen P. (2004). New species of Australian Scissurellidae (Mollusca: Gastropoda: Vetigastropoda) with remarks on Australian and Indo-Malayan species. Zootaxa 714:1-72.
 Geiger, D.L. (2012). Monograph of the little slit shells. Volume 1. Introduction, Scissurellidae. pp. 1-728. Volume 2. Anatomidae, Larocheidae, Depressizonidae, Sutilizonidae, Temnocinclidae. pp. 729-1291. Santa Barbara Museum of Natural History Monographs. Number 7.

External links
 Kase T. & Kano Y. (2002). Trogloconcha, a new genus of larocheine Scissurellidae (Gastropoda: Vetigastropoda) from tropical Indo-Pacific submarine caves. The Veliger. 45(1): 25-32

Larocheidae